Irwin Robert Coolbaugh (July 5, 1939 – June 1985) was an American football wide receiver in the American Football League (AFL) for the Oakland Raiders.  He played college football at the University of Richmond and was drafted in the fifteenth round of the 1961 AFL Draft. Coolbaugh was also drafted in the 12th round of the 1961 NFL Draft by the Washington Redskins.

External links
Bio and stats

1939 births
1985 deaths
American football wide receivers
Richmond Spiders football players
Oakland Raiders players
People from Kingston, Pennsylvania
Players of American football from Pennsylvania
American Football League players